Kafui is a given name and a surname. Notable people include:

Israella Kafui Mansu, Ghanaian entrepreneur
Kafui Adjamagbo-Johnson (born 1958), Togolese politician, lawyer and human rights activist
Kafui Bekui, Ghanaian civil servant
Kenneth Kafui, Ghanaian composer